"Voler" (meaning "Fly") is a French-language song and the third single from Michel Sardou's album, Être une femme 2010. It is a duet with Celine Dion. "Voler" was written by Jacques Vénéruso and Sardou, and produced by Vénéruso and Thierry Blanchard. It went to radio on 2 September 2010, and is available as a music download from Sardou's album, which was released on 30 August 2010. The song reached number 48 on the Belgian Wallonia Singles Chart.

Music video
The music video was released on 22 November 2010 and contains new footage of Sardou and excerpts from Dion's two 2007 videos: "Et s'il n'en restait qu'une (je serais celle-là)" and "Immensité".

Charts

References

2010 singles
2010 songs
Celine Dion songs
French-language songs
Michel Sardou songs
Songs written by Michel Sardou
Songs written by Jacques Veneruso
Male–female vocal duets
th:มายเลิฟ (เพลงเซลีน ดิออน)